A memorial service (Greek: μνημόσυνον, mnemósynon, "memorial";  Slavonic: панихида, panikhída, from Greek παννυχίς, pannychis, "vigil"; Romanian: parastas and Serbian парастос, parastos, from Greek παράστασις, parástasis) is a liturgical solemn service for the repose of the departed in the Eastern Orthodox and Byzantine Catholic churches.

Service

In the Eastern Church, the various prayers for the departed have as their purpose praying for the repose of the departed, comforting the living, and reminding the living of their own mortality and the brevity of this earthly life. For this reason, memorial services have an air of penitence about them. They tend to be served more frequently during the four fasting seasons.

If the service is for an individual, it is often held at the deceased's graveside. If it is a general commemoration of all the departed, or if the individual's grave is not close by, the service is held in a church, in front of a special small, free-standing "memorial table", to which is attached an upright crucifix and with a candelabra for the faithful to put lighted candles.

The deacon (or, if there is no deacon, the priest) swings the censer throughout almost the entire service, while all stand holding lighted candles. Near the end of the service, during the final troparia, all either extinguish their candles, or place them in a candle holder by the memorial table. Each candle symbolizes the individual soul, which, as it were, each person holds in his own hand. The extinguishing (or giving up) of the candle, at the end of the service, symbolizes the fact that each person will have to surrender his soul, at the end of his life. 

The service is composed of Psalms, ektenias (litanies), hymns and prayers. In its outline it follows the general order of Matins and is, in effect, a truncated funeral service. Some of the most notable portions of the service are the Kontakion of the Departed and the final singing of "Memory Eternal" (Slavonic: Vyechnaya Pamyat).

The memorial service is most frequently served at the end of the Divine Liturgy; however, it may also be served after Vespers, Matins, or as a separate service by itself. If the service is held separately, there are readings from the Pauline epistles and the Gospels, which are assigned by the day of the week; no readings, however, are assigned to Sunday because Sunday should emphasize the resurrection of Christ rather than the departed.

Koliva

For the memorial service, koliva (a ritual food of boiled wheat) is often prepared and is placed in front of the memorial table or an icon of Christ. Afterwards, it is blessed by the priest, who sprinkles it with holy water.  The koliva is then taken to the refectory and is served to all those who attended the service.

Occasions
After an Orthodox Christian dies there are special "Prayers for the Departure of the Soul" that are said by the priest. Then the family or friends of the departed will wash and dress the body and it is placed in the casket after which a special expanded memorial service called the First Panikhida is celebrated, following which the reading of the Psalter commences and continues uninterrupted until the funeral. 

Traditionally, in addition to the service on the day of death, the memorial service is performed at the request of the relatives of an individual departed person on the following occasions:
Third day after death
Ninth day
Fortieth day
Three months
Six months
First anniversary of death
Third anniversary (some will request a memorial every year on the anniversary of death) 

It is also served on the numerous Soul Saturdays throughout the year. On these days, not only is the memorial service served, but there are also special propers at Vespers, Matins, and the Divine Liturgy. These days of general memorials are:
Meatfare Saturday (two Saturdays before Great Lent begins)—in some traditions families and friends will offer Panikhidas for their loved ones during the preceding week, culminating in the general commemoration on Saturday 
The second Saturday of Great Lent 
The third Saturday of Great Lent 
The fourth Saturday of Great Lent 
In the Russian tradition, Radonitsa—Tuesday following Thomas Sunday; i.e., the second Tuesday after Pascha (Easter) 
The Saturday before Pentecost—in some traditions families and friends will offer Panikhidas for their loved ones during the preceding week, culminating in the general commemoration on Saturday 
In the Russian tradition, Demetrius Saturday (the Saturday closest to the feast of Saint Demetrius, October 26), commemorating the soldiers who fell in the Battle of Kulikovo (1380), under the leadership of St. Demetrius of the Don. Demetrius Saturday is also observed in other Slavic churches, as well as among the Slavic speakers of northern Greece.

The celebration of memorial services is forbidden from Holy Thursday through Bright Week and on all Sundays throughout the year.

Lity 
A very abbreviated form of the memorial service is called the Lity (or Liti or Litia), from the Greek λιτὴ τελετή, litē teletē, i.e. a plain ceremony, or λιτὸν μνημόσυνον, liton mnēmosynon, i.e. a plain mnemosynon; it consists only of the concluding portion of the regular memorial service. This is often celebrated in the narthex of the church on ordinary weekdays (i.e., when there is no higher-ranking feast day), especially during Great Lent.

In film
The Romanian 2016 film Sieranevada features a parastas in a Bucharest apartment with documentary precision.
While the priest arrives, the family argues about several issues.
The priest and his aides finally arrive, they sing and bless the home and the food that will be distributed as alms.
A Wallachian ritual involving a suit is also a plot element.

See also
Prayer for the dead (Eastern Christianity)
Koliva
Wake (ceremony)

Notes

References

External links
Photo: Memorial Table
Photo: Ektenia during Panikhida
Photo: Blessing Kolyva at the end of a Panikhida

Eastern Orthodox liturgical days
Byzantine Rite
Christianity and death
Funerals